The Ties is a 2020 Italian romantic drama film directed by Daniele Luchetti, based on the 2014 novel of the same name by Domenico Starnone. It stars Alba Rohrwacher, Luigi Lo Cascio, Laura Morante, Silvio Orlando, Giovanna Mezzogiorno, Adriano Giannini, Linda Caridi, and Francesca De Sapio. 

It was selected as the opening film of the 77th Venice International Film Festival, the first Italian film to open the festival since Baarìa (2009).

Plot 
In early 1980s Naples, the marriage of a loving couple is threatened by a potential affair between the husband and a younger woman.

Cast

Release 
The film will have its world premiere on 2 September 2020 at the 77th Venice International Film Festival, out of competition. The film is scheduled to be released in Italy on 1 October 2020 by 01 Distribution.

It will be the opening night film of the 2021 San Diego Italian Film Festival in October 2021.

References

External links
 

2020 films
2020 romantic drama films
Italian romantic drama films
Films about marriage
Films based on Italian novels
Films directed by Daniele Luchetti
Films set in Naples
Films set in Rome
Films set in the 1980s
Films set in the 2010s
2020s Italian-language films
2020s Italian films